In molecular biology, ribosomal s6 kinase (rsk) is a family of protein kinases involved in signal transduction.  There are two subfamilies of rsk, p90rsk, also known as MAPK-activated protein kinase-1 (MAPKAP-K1), and p70rsk, also known as S6-H1 Kinase or simply S6 Kinase.  There are three variants of p90rsk in humans, rsk 1-3.  Rsks are serine/threonine kinases and are activated by the MAPK/ERK pathway.  There are two known mammalian homologues of S6 Kinase: S6K1 and S6K2.

Substrates
Both p90 and p70 Rsk phosphorylate ribosomal protein s6, part of the translational machinery, but several other substrates have been identified, including other ribosomal proteins.  Cytosolic substrates of p90rsk include protein phosphatase 1; glycogen synthase kinase 3 (GSK3); L1 CAM, a neural cell adhesion molecule; Son of Sevenless, the Ras exchange factor; and Myt1, an inhibitor of cdc2.

RSK phosphorylation of SOS1 (Son of Sevenless) at Serines 1134 and 1161 creates 14-3-3 docking site. This interaction of phospho SOS1 and 14-3-3 negatively regulates Ras-MAPK pathway.

p90rsk also regulates transcription factors including cAMP response element-binding protein (CREB); estrogen receptor-α (ERα); IκBα/NF-κB; and c-Fos.

Genomics
p90 Rsk-1 is located at 1p.

p90 Rsk-2 is located at Xp22.2 and contains 22 exons.  Mutations in this gene have been associated with Coffin–Lowry syndrome, a disease characterised by severe psychomotor retardation and other developmental abnormalities.

p90 Rsk-3 is located at 6q27.

Proteomics
The main distinguishing feature between p90rsk and p70rsk is that the 90 kDa family contain two non-identical kinase domains, while the 70 kDa family contain only one kinase domain.

Research history
Rsk was first identified in Xenopus laevis eggs by Erikson and Maller in 1985.

References

External links
 
 

Proteins
Signal transduction